Standard is the name of two different magazines published in France and in Serbia. The French quarterly culture and fashion magazine Standard is published in Paris since 2004. The Serbian weekly newsmagazine Standard was established in 2006 as a print magazine; its print edition was disestablished in 2009.

French culture and fashion magazine
The idea to create Standard magazine was born of a desire to fill a shortage in the French press at the time which had no support for an emerging public interested in culture and fashion alike. Standard stands out by combining the cultural heritage of the French independent press (Actuel, Technikart) and the freshness and design of creative English titles (i-D, Dazed&Confused). It is aimed at a creative, urban readership aged between 16 and 45 years.

Serbian news magazine
 The magazine was sold under the mantra "Sve novine u jednoj" and its editor-in-chief duties are performed by Željko Cvijanović. In addition to its editor, Standards main columnists are Simonida Kažić and Zdravko Brkić. On June 12, 2009 after 159 issues, it was announced that Standard would cease with publishing in print format issue due to financial difficulties and switch over into activities as a web magazine on standard.rs location. The last print issue was #159 on June 4, 2009. Since then, the website has become Novi Standard' and is mostly focused on political news and analytical journalism.

References

External links
Standard - French Culture and Fashion Quarterly 
Novi Standard - Serbian Online News Magazine 
Standard News Magazine 2006–2009 archive 

Defunct magazines published in Serbia
Magazines established in 2004
Magazines established in 2006
Magazines disestablished in 2009
Serbian-language magazines
French-language magazines
Quarterly magazines published in France
Magazines published in Paris